Rachael Blackmore (born 11 July 1989) is an Irish jockey who competes in National Hunt racing. In 2021, she became the first female jockey to win the Grand National in the 182-year history of the race. She also became the first woman to be leading jockey at the Cheltenham Festival with six victories, including the Champion Hurdle, in 2021. The following year she became the first female jockey to win the Cheltenham Gold Cup.

Blackmore's achievements saw her named the 2021 RTÉ Sports Person of the Year and the BBC World Sport Star of the Year.

Early life

The daughter of a teacher and a farmer (Eimir and Charles), Blackmore grew up on a dairy farm in Killenaule, County Tipperary, Ireland, and first started riding ponies at just two years of age. Growing up she took part in pony club meetings, hunting, eventing and pony racing. She gained a degree in equine science at the University of Limerick, while riding out and competing as an amateur jockey.

Career

Blackmore rode her first winner as an amateur jockey on 10 February 2011, when Stowaway Pearl, trained by Shark Hanlon, won the Tipperary Ladies’ Handicap Hurdle at Thurles. She turned professional in March 2015, having ridden eleven point-to-point winners and seven winners as an amateur rider. Her first winner as a professional was Most Honourable, trained by Hanlon, at Clonmel on 3 September 2015. In 2017, she became the first woman to win the conditional riders' championship in Ireland.
 
In 2018 Blackmore had her first ride in the Grand National. Her mount, Alpha des Obeaux, trained by Mouse Morris, went off at 33/1 and fell at the fifteenth fence, the Chair.
 
Her first Cheltenham Festival winner came in 2019 when A Plus Tard landed the Chase Brothers Novices' Handicap Chase. She then gained her first Grade 1 victory when Minella Indo won the Albert Bartlett Novices' Hurdle. Both winners were trained by Henry de Bromhead for whom Blackmore was by now riding as stable jockey. In the 2019 Grand National Blackmore finished in tenth place on the de Bromhead-trained 66/1 chance Valseur Lido.
 
Blackmore's first Grade 1 race victory in Ireland came in April 2019 when Honeysuckle won the Mares Novice Hurdle Championship Final at Fairyhouse. Blackmore finished the season with 90 winners and took the runner-up spot in the Irish jump racing Champion Jockey competition behind Paul Townend. Honeysuckle provided Blackmore with another Cheltenham Festival win in the Close Brothers Mares' Hurdle in 2020. Blackmore finished third in the Irish jump racing championship in the curtailed 2019–20 season.
 
In 2021, she achieved two notable "firsts" at the Cheltenham Festival, becoming the first female jockey to partner a winner of the Champion Hurdle when she rode Honeysuckle to victory and, by finishing with six winners across the four days, she also became the first female jockey to win the Ruby Walsh Trophy for leading Cheltenham jockey.
 
On 10 April Blackmore rode Minella Times to victory in the 2021 Grand National, becoming the first female jockey to win the race. Minella Times, trained by de Bromhead, went off as fourth favourite at 11/1 and, having given Blackmore a "sensational spin", passed the post 6½ lengths in front of stablemate and runner-up Balko Des Flos.
Due to COVID-19 protocols, there were no spectators on the course to witness Blackmore's historic victory. Interviewed by ITV after the race, she said: "I don't feel male or female right now. I don't even feel human.... It's unbelievable".

At the 2022 Cheltenham Festival, Blackmore secured a repeat win on Honeysuckle in the Champion Hurdle and then became the first female jockey to win the Cheltenham Gold Cup, riding favourite A Plus Tard to a 15 length victory.

Personal life
As of April 2021, Blackmore is in a relationship with jockey Brian Hayes.

Cheltenham Festival winners (14) 
 Cheltenham Gold Cup - (1) - A Plus Tard (2022)
 Baring Bingham Novices' Hurdle – (1) – Bob Olinger (2021)
 Champion Bumper – (1) – Sir Gerhard (2021)
 Champion Hurdle – (2) – Honeysuckle (2021, 2022)
 Centenary Novices' Handicap Chase – (1) – A Plus Tard (2019)
 David Nicholson Mares' Hurdle – (2) – Honeysuckle (2020,2023)
 Dawn Run Mares' Novices' Hurdle – (1) – Telmesomethinggirl (2021)
 Golden Miller Novices' Chase - (1) - Bob Olinger (2022)
 Ryanair Chase – (2) – Allaho (2021), Envoi Allen (2023)
 Albert Bartlett Novices' Hurdle – (1) Minella Indo (2019)
 Triumph Hurdle – (1) – Quilixios (2021)

Major wins

 Ireland
 Arkle Novice Chase – (1) Notebook (2020)
 Hatton's Grace Hurdle – (3) Honeysuckle (2019, 2020, 2021)
 Irish Champion Hurdle – (3) Honeysuckle (2020, 2021, 2022)
 Irish Daily Mirror Novice Hurdle – (1) Minella Indo (2019)
 Ladbrokes Champion Chase - (1) Envoi Allen (2022)
 Mares Novice Hurdle Championship Final – (1) Honeysuckle (2019)
 Paddy's Reward Club Chase – (2) A Plus Tard (2019), Envoi Allen (2021)
 Punchestown Champion Hurdle - (2) Honeysuckle (2021,2022)
 Racing Post Novice Chase – (1) Notebook (2019)
 Slaney Novice Hurdle – (1) Bob Olinger (2021)

 Great Britain
 Betfair Chase - (1) - A Plus Tard (2021)

Awards
On 17 December 2021, Blackmore was named The Irish Times' Ireland Sportswoman of the Year 2021. The same week she was crowned Horse Racing Ireland Irish Racing Hero and RTÉ Sports Person of the Year. On 19 December she received the BBC Sports Personality World Sport Star of the Year.

References

External links

1989 births
Living people
Irish female jockeys
Sportspeople from County Tipperary
Alumni of the University of Limerick
BBC Sports Personality World Sport Star of the Year winners